This is a List of municipalities in Adıyaman Province, Turkey .

References 

Geography of Adıyaman Province
Adiyaman